Paurano is a village in Tuscany, central Italy, in the comune of Colle di Val d'Elsa, province of Siena.

Paurano is about 32 km from Siena and 10 km from Colle di Val d'Elsa.

Bibliography 
 

Frazioni of Colle di Val d'Elsa